16th Street may refer to:

 16th Street (Manhattan), a street in New York City
 16th Street station (BMT Fifth Avenue Line), a former New York City subway station
 16th Street Baptist Church, a church in Birmingham, Alabama
 16th Street Mall, a pedestrian and transit mall in Denver, Colorado
 16th Street Park, a municipal park in Bayonne, New Jersey
 16th Street station (Sacramento), a light rail station in Sacramento, California
 16th Street station (Oakland), a former railroad station in Oakland, California
 16th Street NW, a street in Washington, D.C.
 Sixteenth Street Historic District, a historic district on 16th Street NW in Washington, D.C.
 16th Street (San Francisco), a street in San Francisco, California
 16th Street Mission station, a Bay Area Rapid Transit station in San Francisco, California
 Church and 16th Street station, a light rail station in San Francisco, California

See also
 16th Street Bridge (disambiguation)